Gervillaria is an extinct genus of saltwater clams, marine bivalve molluscs that lived from the Triassic to the Cretaceous in Asia, Europe, North America, and South America.

References
 Fossils (Smithsonian Handbooks) by David Ward (Page 96)

External links
Gervillaria in the Paleobiology Database

Bakevelliidae
Prehistoric bivalve genera
Triassic bivalves
Jurassic bivalves
Cretaceous bivalves
Mesozoic animals of Asia
Mesozoic animals of Europe
Mesozoic animals of North America
Mesozoic animals of South America
Triassic first appearances
Cretaceous extinctions